Nechayevka is a rural locality (a selo) and the administrative centre of Nechayevsky Selsoviet, Kizilyurtovsky District, Republic of Dagestan, Russia. The population was 4,779 as of 2010. There are 86 streets.

Geography 
Nechayevka is located 9 km northeast of Kizilyurt (the district's administrative centre) by road, on the right bank of the Sulak River. Matseyevka and Akhtini are the nearest rural localities.

Nationalities 
Avars live there.

References 

Rural localities in Kizilyurtovsky District